Carex krausei, commonly known as Krause's sedge or carex de Krause in Canada, is a tussock-forming species of perennial sedge in the family Cyperaceae. It is native to subarctic areas of Greenland, Alaska, northern Canada and Russia.

Description
There can be four to ten lateral spikes containing 10 to 20 flowers.

Taxonomy
The species was first formally described by the botanist Johann Otto Boeckeler in 1886 as a part of the work Botanische Jahrbücher für Systematik, Pflanzengeschichte und Pflanzengeographie. There are four synonyms;
 Carex capillaris f. krausei Kük. 
 Carex capillaris subsp. krausei (Boeckeler) Böcher 
 Carex capillaris var. krausei Krantz in Macoun 
 Carex nana Cham. ex Steud.
There are also two subspecies;
 Carex krausei subsp. krausei
 Carex krausei subsp. porsildiana (Polunin) Á.Löve, D.Löve & Raymond.

Distribution
It is found in sub arctic to temperate biomes in the northern hemisphere. It is found in Alaska and most parts of Canada including Yukon, Nunavut, the Northwest Territories and Quebec in the north down to British Columbia, Manitoba and Ontario in the south. It is also found in Greenland. In Russia the range extends from Chukotka Autonomous Okrug in the east through northern European Russia to Northwestern Federal District. It is also found in Svalbard further to the north.

See also
List of Carex species

References

krausei
Taxa named by Johann Otto Boeckeler
Plants described in 1886
Flora of Alaska
Flora of British Columbia
Flora of Greenland
Flora of Iceland
Flora of Manitoba
Flora of the Northwest Territories
Flora of Nunavut
Flora of Ontario
Flora of Quebec
Flora of Svalbard
Flora of Siberia
Flora of Yukon
Flora of Altai (region)
Flora of Irkutsk Oblast
Flora of Magadan Oblast
Flora of North European Russia